Robert Boyd "Tut" Patterson (December 13, 1921 – September 21, 2017) was an American plantation manager and former college football star who is known for founding the first Citizens' Councils, a white supremacist organization, established in Indianola, Mississippi in 1954, in response to the Brown v. Board of Education decision. In 1966 he helped found Pillow Academy, near Greenwood.

As a boy in Clarksdale, he was close friends—"playing, fishing, hunting, wrestling"—with Aaron Henry, who grew up to become a founder of the Regional Council of Negro Leadership, the Mississippi Freedom Democratic Party, the Council of Federated Organizations and the Mississippi branch of the NAACP.

Patterson graduated from the Mississippi State College School of Agriculture in 1943. At 17 he hitchhiked from Clarksdale to Starkville to try out with the Bulldogs, "hoping to earn a scholarship to play football and study farming." He failed in the tryouts as a center, but when placed as an end he succeeded so emphatically that he was awarded a four-year scholarship. He was on the 1940 Orange Bowl championship team, the only undefeated team in the school's history.  In 1942 he was made captain. That year he played in the Blue-Gray College All Star game and was selected as an All Southeastern Conference end. He was named to the MSU Sports Hall of Fame in 1995.

At Mississippi State he pledged to Sigma Alpha Epsilon. He was a member of Alpha Zeta agricultural fraternity as well as ROTC and the honors clubs Phi Eta Sigma, Blue Key and Omicron Delta Kappa, and was president of the school's athletic society the M-Club in his senior year.

Patterson was a veteran of World War II, at 24 attaining the rank of major. He was a paratrooper with the 82nd Airborne Division. He made 16 parachute jumps, including into Normandy, and fought with General James M. Gavin in the Battle of the Bulge. The 82nd Airborne was one of the first American occupying troops in Berlin; Patterson was appointed Division Provost Marshal for Berlin by General Gavin, who later played an important part in integrating the Army.

References

Bibliography

1921 births
2017 deaths
Mississippi State Bulldogs football players
United States Army personnel of World War II
Citizens' Councils
People from Carroll County, Mississippi
Neo-Confederates